Zubovići is a village in Croatia located on the island of Pag.

References

Populated places in Lika-Senj County